is a Japanese manga created, written and illustrated by Hiroshi Kawamoto and later adapted to anime by Tatsunoko Productions. It ran 38 episodes on TV Tokyo from April 6, 1989, to January 18, 1990, and also received a 6-episode OVA followup series named , that ran from August 16, 1991, to March 16, 1992.

Set in a parallel world called "Tenkūkai", which exists alongside Earth, evil forces known as the Asura Gods threaten to overcome the forces of good, causing the magical leader of this realm to transport warriors from Earth to their world. It's based on Hindu and Buddhist mythology.

Plot
The plot revolves around two boys, Shurato Hidaka and Gai Kuroki, lifelong best friends who are polar opposites of each other in appearance and personality. While fighting each other in a martial arts tournament, they are suddenly encased in a beam of light and transported to a parallel world, Tenkūkai, where modern technology does not exist and instead the people rely on Sohma, a form of spiritual energy.

Shurato discovers he is actually the reincarnation of an ancient king of the same name, who once ruled this world, and one of the "Hachibushu", a group of eight legendary warriors with large quantities of Sohma, and was brought here along with Gai to fight the Asura Gods, a legion of destructive warriors. However, for unknown reasons, Gai attempts to kill Shurato repeatedly, confusing Shurato as the real Gai is a pacifist and the most compassionate person he knows.

Things quickly go wrong when Shurato and another of the Hachibushu, Ten-ō Hyūga, are framed for the petrification of Lady Vishnu, a powerful divinity and the leader of the people of Tenkūkai. The actual culprit, Vishnu's highest advisor and Asura spy Indrah, and the corrupted Gai manage to convince the remainder of the Hachibushu, as well as all of Tenkūkai's warriors and soldiers, that Shurato and Hyūga are evil and must be killed.

Although at first reluctant to get involved, Shurato eventually resolves to aid Hyūga in uncovering the conspiracy and cure Vishnu. They are accompanied by the young Tenkūkai spirit priestess Lakshu, and two others of the Hachibushu, Ryū-ō Ryōma and Karura-ō Reiga. Along the way, they engage in battle with the other four of the Hachibushu, sinister Asura agents in league with Indrah, and the majority of Tenkūkai's population.

Characters

(also )
 The titular main protagonist of the series, Shurato, is a hot-headed, reckless, and impatient 16-year-old. He is depicted as having low tolerance and understanding of Tenkūkai's laws and inner workings, but is strong and pure-hearted. Like Gai, he is a martial arts master, and eventually becomes the most powerful of the Hachibushu and their de facto leader. His shakti and armor are both modeled after the lion, and his weapon is a vajra.

(also )
 A primary character and one of the main antagonists of the show, Gai was Shurato's best friend on Earth, but became his greatest enemy in Tenkūkai when he was put in a spell by Indrah. Unlike Shurato, he is cool, collected, and highly intelligent. He was a martial arts master, depicted as Shurato's equal, even though he was also a pacifist. His shakti and armor are both modeled after the wolf, and his weapon is a longsword.

 
 Based on the Hindu goddess Lakshmi, Lakshu is a young native of Tenkūkai and a fledgling spirit priestess. She is the first person to find Shurato after he is teleported to Tenkūkai, attempting to wake him up with a kiss. She then accompanies Shurato and Hyūga on their journey, and becomes a major asset to the team when her latent Sohma powers manifest.

Media

Anime and OVA
The TV series premiered on TV Tokyo, where it ran for 38 episodes from April 6, 1989, to January 1990. Following its success, it was dubbed in Brazil, France, Spain, Venezuela, Indonesia, Philippines, South Korea, Taiwan and China releases. The 6-episode OVA series began release on August 16, 1991, and ended on March 16, 1992.

Theme songs
 Opening theme
 "Shining Soul" by Satoko Shimizu (epi. 01–25)
 "Truth" by Satoko Shimizu (epi. 26–38)
 "Keep Your Pure Love" by Satoko Shimizu (OVA 1–6)

 Ending theme
 "Sabaku no Meizu (Desert Labyrinth)" by Satoko Shimizu (epi. 01–25)
 "Caravan" by Satoko Shimizu (epi. 26–38)
 "Garasu no Shōnen (Glass Boy)" by Satoko Shimizu (OVA 1–6)

Other media
Aside from the TV series and subsequent OVA, Shurato's popularity also spurred the release of myriad related merchandise, including books, trading cards, action figures, pencil boards, school notebooks, novels and drama CDs.

Mechanical designers 
 Studio Ammonite (Hiroshi Ogawa , Hiroshi Okura , and Takashi Ono.)

References

External links
 
 

1988 manga
1989 anime television series debuts
1991 anime OVAs
Action anime and manga
Isekai anime and manga
Martial arts anime and manga
Shōnen Gahōsha manga
Shōnen manga
TV Tokyo original programming
Tatsunoko Production